Zander Clark (born 26 June 1992) is a Scottish professional footballer who plays as a goalkeeper for Hearts. Clark previously played for St Johnstone, where he had one loan spell at Elgin City and two loan spells at Queen of the South.

Club career

St Johnstone
Raised in Clydebank, Clark started his career in the youth sides at Hamilton Academical and then St Johnstone. On 4 July 2011, Clark joined Elgin City on loan ahead of the 2011–12 season.

On 17 October 2013, Clark signed for Queen of the South on loan until 1 January 2014. He made his debut on 19 October 2013, in a 2–1 defeat against Dundee. On 14 January 2014, the loan was extended until the end of the season.

On 14 May 2014, Clark signed a new two-year contract with St Johnstone. On 25 July 2014, Queen of the South announced that Clark had returned to the club on loan for the season. Queens announced on 28 May 2015 that Clark was returning to St Johnstone.

Clark made his first appearance for St Johnstone on 26 September 2015, coming on as a substitute in a 2–1 win against Dundee United. It was announced shortly afterwards that Clark had signed a new contract with St Johnstone, due to run until the summer of 2018.

In July 2017 he was taken to hospital following a head injury in a friendly match against Sunderland. He was released from hospital after being diagnosed with a concussion.

Clark was suggested as a possible candidate for the Scotland international squad during the 2018–19 season, particularly when he kept five consecutive clean sheets in the autumn
and also after a good performance in a 2–0 home defeat against Celtic in early February. Later in February 2019 he suffered a hamstring injury.

During a Scottish Cup quarter-final against the Scottish champions Rangers in April 2021, Clark assisted in St Johnstone's 122nd-minute goal to take the game into a penalty shoot-out. Having come up the field for a corner, Clark flicked on Liam Craig's cross, and the ball was turned into the goal by Chris Kane. In the shoot-out itself, Clark saved attempts from James Tavernier and Kemar Roofe as St Johnstone won 4–2 to progress to the semi-finals. They went on to win the trophy, with Clark keeping a clean sheet in the final (as he had in the League Cup Final three months earlier).

Clark left St Johnstone in June 2022, and was linked with transfers to Dundee United and English club Stoke City.

Heart of Midlothian
On 2 September 2022, Clark joined Scottish Premiership club Heart of Midlothian on a three-year contract. He made his debut for the club on 24 December 2022, coming on as a substitute after Craig Gordon broke his leg.

International career
Clark received his first call-up to the senior Scotland squad in August 2021 for games against Denmark, Moldova and Austria. He earned his second call up in November 2021. He pulled out of the Scotland squad in June 2022 as he was due to get married. He was recalled to the Scotland squad in March 2023, as he has played regularly for Hearts following an injury to Craig Gordon.

Career statistics

Honours
St Johnstone
Scottish Cup: 2020–21
Scottish League Cup: 2020–21

References

External links

1992 births
Living people
Footballers from Glasgow
Sportspeople from Clydebank
Footballers from West Dunbartonshire
People educated at Braidfield High School
Scottish footballers
St Johnstone F.C. players
Elgin City F.C. players
Queen of the South F.C. players
Scottish Football League players
Scottish Professional Football League players
Association football goalkeepers
Heart of Midlothian F.C. players
Hamilton Academical F.C. players